The ex officio oath developed in the first half of the 17th century (1600 to 1650), and was used as a form of coercion, persecution, and forcible self-incrimination in the religious trials of that era. It took the form of a religious oath made by the accused prior to questioning by the Star Chamber, to answer truthfully all questions that might be asked. It gave rise to what became known as the cruel trilemma where the accused would find themselves trapped between a breach of religious oath (taken extremely seriously in that era, a mortal sin, and perjury), contempt of court for silence, or self-incrimination. The name derives from the questioner putting the accused on oath ex officio, meaning by virtue of his office or position.

Outcry against this practice (particularly in the trials of John Lilburne ("Freeborn John") around 1630–1649) led to the establishment of the right to not incriminate oneself in common law. This was the direct precursor of similar rights in modern law, including the right to silence and non-self-incrimination in the Fifth Amendment to the United States Constitution. The right itself appears as item 16 in the Levellers Agreement of the Free People of England (1649) and first appeared in US law in the Massachusetts Body of Liberties and the Connecticut Code of the same era. The Star Chamber itself, as a judicial body, was abolished by Parliament as part of the Habeas Corpus Act 1640.

Privilege against self-incrimination 
Early examples of a codified right appears in the Levellers manifesto Agreement of the Free People of England (published 1 May 1649): "[I]t shall not be in the power of any Representative, to punish, or cause to be punished, any person or persons for refusing to answer questions against themselves in Criminall cases".

The right first appeared in US law in the Massachusetts Body of Liberties and the Connecticut Code of the same era.

The United States Supreme Court summarized the events of the time as part of the historical background in the landmark case Miranda v. Arizona:

See also 
 Ecclesiastical law
 Inquisition
 History of human rights
 Right to silence in England and Wales
 Hale Commission

References

Canon law
History of human rights
Counter-Reformation
Levellers
Criminal procedure
Evidence law